Colgate is an American brand principally used for oral hygiene products such as toothpastes, toothbrushes, mouthwashes and dental floss. Manufactured by Colgate-Palmolive, Colgate's oral hygiene products were first sold by the company in 1873, sixteen years after the death of the founder, William Colgate. The company originally sold soap.

Colgate toothpaste was sold in glass jars since 1873. Tubes, as pioneered by Kalodont, Johnson & Johnson (Zonweiss) and Sheffield, were introduced in 1896.

Colgate became popular in the 1950s, with the slogan "It Cleans Your Breath While It Cleans Your Teeth", written by copywriter Alicia Tobin.

In 2007, the Advertising Standards Authority in the UK told Colgate that it could no longer make the claim that four out of five dentists recommended Colgate. The investigation showed that the study had telephone surveyed dentists to list the toothpaste they recommended, and their competitors were recommended at similar rates. The claim was deemed deceptive.

As of 2015, oral care products (principally produced under the Colgate brand) were the Colgate-Palmolive company's largest source of income, making up around US$7.5 billion, or 47% of net sales globally (with personal care products such as shampoos making up 20%, home care products such as laundry detergents 19% and pet nutrition making up the remaining 14%). It also commanded approximately 70% of the oral care market in Brazil.

In 2018, Colgate licensed Kolibree technology from Paris-based Baracoda Daily Healthtech, launching the Colgate Smart Electric toothbrush. They currently offer connected toothbrushes for children and adults under the Hum brand umbrella.

In January 2020, Colgate registered the label for toothpaste containing hemp seed oil with the U.S. government.

In February 2020, Colgate's parent company announced an agreement to purchase Hello Products, a New Jersey company that had earlier in the month introduced toothpaste, mouthwashes, and lip balms containing cannabidiol (CBD).

As of June 2022, Colgate Tooth Powder was still being manufactured and marketed, and could still be purchased.

Facts
According to a 2015 report by market research company Kantar Worldpanel, Colgate is the only brand in the world purchased by more than half of all households. Colgate has a global market penetration of 67.7% and a global market share of 45%. Despite this, it maintained the highest growth rate of all brands in the survey, with 40 million new households purchasing Colgate-branded products in 2014.

See also

List of toothpaste brands
Index of oral health and dental articles

References

External links

1873 introductions
American brands
Brands of toothpaste
Colgate-Palmolive brands